Juncus coriaceus, the leathery rush, is a species of flowering plant in the family Juncaceae, native to the southeastern United States, from Texas to Cape May, New Jersey. A report from New York state turns out to have been erroneous. A wetland species, it prefers poorly drained soils.

References

coriaceus
Endemic flora of the United States
Flora of Texas
Flora of Oklahoma
Flora of the Southeastern United States
Flora of New Jersey
Plants described in 1929
Flora without expected TNC conservation status